Willowbrook Mall is an enclosed regional mall in Willowbrook, Houston, Texas at the intersection of Texas State Highway 249 and Farm to Market Road 1960. The mall has 6 anchor stores: Dick's Sporting Goods, Dillard's, J. C. Penney, Macy's, and Nordstrom Rack. In 2000, the mall was the 3rd largest Houston-area retail development based on net rentable area.

History
The mall was developed by, Homart Development Company, a unit of Sears. It  opened in 1981, a time of high growth for the area, with anchors Foley's, Joske's, Montgomery Ward, and Sears. Macy's opened a store in 1984 and J. C. Penney added a store in 1992, bringing the total number of anchor stores to 6.

The mall was sold to a group of investors in 1990. The mall underwent extensive remodeling in 1992.

Joske's was bought by Dillard's in 1987. After opening a larger location in 1997 that was originally occupied by Macy's, Dillard's planned to operate its original Joske's location featuring a men's department and housewares and stock the usual merchandise in the space formerly occupied by Macy's. However, Dillard's abandoned plans to operate 2 stores at the mall in 1998 and sold the original Joske's store to Lord & Taylor, which opened a  store later the same year. As part of May Department Stores' reconfiguration of Lord & Taylor, the store was closed in January 2004, and the location eventually became Nordstrom Rack.

Montgomery Ward closed its store in March 2001 after the company went out of business. The store was taken over by Foley's in 2003. In 2006, the two Foley's stores became Macy's.

In 2001, the mall was acquired by General Growth Properties from a pension fund managed by Lend Lease Real Estate Investments Inc. At that time the mall was "one of the most successful retail shopping malls in Houston, consistently ranking near the Houston Galleria, Memorial City Mall and Baybrook Mall as one of the area's top-grossing malls per square foot, producing sales of about $430 per square foot". Dillard's completed a renovation of its store the same year, expanding it by 50%.

In April 2015, Lush opened a store in the mall.

In October 2016, the mall added Dick's Sporting Goods. Zara also opened a location in the mall in 2016.

In 2017, Think Geek and Charlotte Russe opened stores at the mall.

On February 6, 2020, it was announced that Sears would be closing as part of a plan to close 31 stores nationwide. The store closed in April 2020.

References

External links

 
Harris County Block Book map for Willowbrook Mall: JPG, PDF and section 2: JPG, PDF

Brookfield Properties
Shopping malls in Houston
Shopping malls established in 1981